The Hungarian Pro Circuit Ladies Open (previously known as the Sport11 Ladies Open) is a tournament for professional female tennis players played on outdoor clay courts. The event was classified as a $100,000 ITF Women's Circuit tournament and was held in Budapest, Hungary, from 2016 to 2018. In 2022, the tournament made a comeback after being rebranded as the Budapest Open 125, a $115,000 tournament on the WTA Challenger Tour.

Past finals

Singles

Doubles

External links
  
 ITF search 

Hungarian Pro Circuit Ladies Open
Clay court tennis tournaments
Tennis tournaments in Hungary
Recurring sporting events established in 2016
Recurring sporting events disestablished in 2018
Defunct sports competitions in Hungary 
Hungarian Pro Circuit Ladies Open